Madeleine is a biography of Noor Inayat Khan, authored by her close friend Jean Overton Fuller, and first published by Victor Gollancz in 1952. It was initially rejected by six of seven publishers Fuller submitted it to, but eventually had some success and was reprinted in 1971, with added detail of Khan's ancestry.

References 

1952 non-fiction books
British non-fiction books
Biographies about writers
Books about espionage
Books about World War II